Mehmet Feyzi Yıldırım (born 23 January 1996) is a Turkish professional footballer who plays as a right-back for Süper Lig club Kasımpaşa.

Professional career
Yıldırım is a youth product of Eskişehirspor since 2009. Yıldırım made his professional debut with Eskişehirspor in a 3-0 Turkish Cup win over Balçova Yaşamspor on 16 January 2015. He continued his development on loans with Afyonspor, Nazilli Belediyespor, and Niğde Anadolu in semi-pro Turkish leagues. He returned to Eskişehirspor in 2018 where he was promoted to the main squad. On 2 September 2020, he signed with Kasımpaşa in the Süper Lig.

International career
Yıldırım is a youth international for Turkey, having represented the Turkey U19s in 2015.

References

External links
 
 

1996 births
Living people
People from Çifteler
Turkish footballers
Turkey youth international footballers
Eskişehirspor footballers
Nazilli Belediyespor footballers
Kasımpaşa S.K. footballers
Niğde Anadolu FK footballers
Süper Lig players
TFF First League players
TFF Second League players
Association football fullbacks